Peter Roe (born 23 September 1955 in Manchester, England) is a Canadian international soccer player who spent twelve seasons in the North American Soccer League and two in the Major Indoor Soccer League. He also earned nine caps, scoring one goal, with the Canadian national soccer team between 1974 and 1983.

Professional
Born in England, Roe moved to Bramalea, Ontario with his family when he was eleven.  In 1973, Roe signed with the Toronto Metros of the North American Soccer League as an eighteen-year-old.  In 1975, the Metros merged with Toronto Croatia to form Toronto Metros-Croatia. In 1976, he played in the National Soccer League with Toronto Italia. In 1979, the team came under new ownership which renamed the team the Toronto Blizzard.  Roe continued to play for the club until 1980 through these name changes.  He also briefly played for the New York Arrows during the 1978–79 Major Indoor Soccer League season.  In 1980, Roe began the season with the Blizzard before moving to the Vancouver Whitecaps.  He played the 1980–81 NASL indoor season with Vancouver, then began the 1981 outdoor season there before moving to the Tampa Bay Rowdies.  The Rowdies released him 1984 and Roe signed with the Tacoma Stars of the MISL.  He returned to the Rowdies in 1986 when it entered the American Indoor Soccer Association. When the Rowdies entered the American Soccer League in 1988, Roe again played for them. He is also the older brother of retired Canadian soccer player Paul Roe.

National team
In 1973, Roe was up to the Canada U-20 men's national soccer team for a February 20, 1973 match with Nicaragua.  He would go on to play seven times for the Canadian U-20 team in 1973 and 1974.  He scored his only goal at the youth level in a 5–0 victory over the Dominican Republic on August 21, 1974.  His last game with the U-20s came in a 2–2 tie with Cuba on August 26, 1974.  He earned his first cap with the senior team two months later.  On October 9, 1974, he started in a 2–0 loss to East Germany.  His last match was a 2–0 loss to Scotland on June 19, 1983.  Roe also played nine games for the Canadian Olympic Team including four at the 1975 Pan American games.

References

External links
 Canada Soccer
 Brampton Sports Hall of Fame inductee page
 NASL/MISL stats

1955 births
Living people
American Indoor Soccer Association players
American Soccer League (1988–89) players
Footballers from Manchester
English emigrants to Canada
Expatriate soccer players in the United States
Canadian expatriate sportspeople in the United States
Canada men's youth international soccer players
Canadian National Soccer League players
Canada men's international soccer players
Canadian expatriate soccer players
Canadian soccer players
Olympic soccer players of Canada
Footballers at the 1976 Summer Olympics
Major Indoor Soccer League (1978–1992) players
Naturalized citizens of Canada
New York Arrows players
North American Soccer League (1968–1984) indoor players
North American Soccer League (1968–1984) players
Soccer players from Brampton
Pan American Games competitors for Canada
Footballers at the 1975 Pan American Games
Tacoma Stars players
Tampa Bay Rowdies (1975–1993) players
Toronto Blizzard (1971–1984) players
Toronto Italia players
Vancouver Whitecaps (1974–1984) players
Association football utility players
Association football defenders
Association football midfielders
Association football forwards